The , also called as Daini-Keihan Road, is a national highway and 6-laned Regional High-Standard Highways (expressway) in Japan, leading from Fushimi-ku, Kyoto through Kansai Science City to Kadoma, Osaka. This road is a bypass of Japan National Route 1.

Expressway part

It is signed E89 under Ministry of Land, Infrastructure, Transport and Tourism's  "2016 Proposal for Realization of Expressway Numbering." The length of this road is 35.7 km.

Interchanges and features

 IC - interchange, SIC - smart interchange, JCT - junction, SA - service area, PA - parking area, BS - bus stop, CB - snow chains, TN - tunnel, BR - bridge, TB - Toll Gate

Highway Part
The length of this road is 29.7 km.

References

External links

Kyoto National Highway Office

Expressways in Japan
Regional High-Standard Highways in Japan